2022 Afghanistan earthquake may refer to:

January 2022 Afghanistan earthquakes
June 2022 Afghanistan earthquake
September 2022 Afghanistan earthquake